Raquel Lourenço-Winkler (born 21 March 1992) is a Portuguese professional wrestler best known under the ring name Killer Kelly, currently signed to Impact Wrestling. She is best known for her tenure with WWE where she competed on the NXT UK brand, and for her time in the independent wrestling scene, mostly working in Westside Xtreme Wrestling as well as Pro-Wrestling: EVE.

Professional wrestling career

Independent circuit (2016–2022) 
Lourenço made her professional wrestling debut in 2016 for Wrestling Portugal as Kelly in a battle royal. Throughout the rest of 2016, Kelly continued to pick up victories in Wrestling Portugal. In May 2017, Kelly made her World Stars Of Wrestling debut and was defeated by Nina Samuels. In August, now as Killer Kelly, she made her debut for Revolution Championship Wrestling, losing to Camille in her debut. The next night she teamed with Camille and Debbie Sharp where they were defeated by Hana Kimura, Kagetsu and Dragonita of Oedo Tai. In December 2017, she was defeated by Alpha Female at a Next Step Wrestling show. In March 2018, she made her debut for Pro-Wrestling: EVE, losing to Charlie Morgan. On 1 April 2018 she made her Revolution Pro Wrestling debut, losing to Bobbi Tyler. In late April she was defeated by Viper. On 1 February 2020, Kelly was announced to be competing against Allysin Kay at Josh Barnett's Bloodsport during Mania weekend. However, that event was postponed due to the 2019-20 coronavirus pandemic.

Westside Xtreme Wrestling (2017–2022) 
Killer Kelly made her Westside Xtreme Wrestling debut at Femmes Fatales 2017, losing to Laura Di Matteo. The same day she was defeated by Jinny. At wXw's 17th anniversary show, she became the inaugural wXw Women's champion after defeating Melanie Gray in the finals of the Women's title tournament after both women scored the most points in the tournament. A month later she lost the title to Toni Storm. On an episode of Shotgun, she was defeated by Veda Scott. In May 2018, Kelly and Marius Al-Ani defeated Absolute Andy and Melanie Gray. On 19 May Kelly and Toni Storm defeated LuFisto and Gray.

WWE (2018–2020) 
Lourenço made her WWE debut on the first night of the 2018 United Kingdom Championship tournament in a three way number one contenders match for the NXT Women's Championship. The following night she was defeated by Charlie Morgan. She competed in the 2018 Mae Young Classic, losing to Meiko Satomura in the first round. On the 24 October edition of NXT UK, she would lose to Dakota Kai. In January 2020, Kelly was released by WWE.

Progress Wrestling (2018) 
In July 2018, she made her Progress Wrestling debut at Chapter 73, losing to Toni Storm.

Impact Wrestling (2020, 2022–present)
On 14 November 2020, at Turning Point, Impact Wrestling confirmed that Kelly would make her debut on Impact by participating at a tournament to crown the new Impact Knockouts Tag Team Champions along with Renee Michelle. Kelly made her official debut on the 24 November episode of Impact! where she faced Kimber Lee in a losing effort. On the 1 December episode of Impact!, Kelly and Michelle were defeated by Jazz and Jordynne Grace during the first round of the Knockouts Tag Team Championship Tournament. On the 7 July 2022 episode of Impact!, a vignette of Kelly was aired upon her return. She made her return on the 4 August episode of Impact!, attacking two local talents after their match and setting her sights on Tasha Steelz. The following week, Kelly made her in-ring return, defeating Tiffany Nieves in a quick squash. Throughout the summer, Kelly started going after Steelz and Savannah Evans. On 23 September, at the Countdown to Victory Road pre-show, Kelly lost to Steelz by disqualification after choking the referee and Steelz with a steel chain. At Bound for Glory, she competed in the Call Your Shot Gauntlet, where the winner could choose any championship match of their choice, being eliminated by Steelz. The following night, (which aired on tape delay on 13 October), Kelly defeated Steelz in a no disqualification match.

On 13 January 2023, at Hard To Kill, Kelly competed in a four-way match to determine the number one contender to the Impact Knockouts World Championship, which was won by Masha Slamovich. On the following week's episode of Impact!, Kelly defeated Taylor Wilde. In February, Kelly started teaming with Wilde and fought Impact Knockouts World Tag Team Champions The Death Dollz (Jessicka, Rosemary and Taya Valkyrie) in a non-title bout, but lost when Wilde played with her tarot cards and refused to help Kelly. On the March 9 episode of Impact!, Kelly confronted Wilde over the incident, but was attacked by the debuting KiLynn King.

Personal life 
Lourenço has a brother. She started watching professional wrestling when she was 7. Prior to being trained, Lourenço had wrestled in backyard wrestling promotions. She names Low Ki, Gail Kim, Katsuyori Shibata, Asuka, Mickie James and Charlotte Flair as influences. In 2017 she moved to Duisburg, North Rhine-Westphalia, Germany. Kelly currently streams on the Twitch platform on a weekly basis, where she streams wrestling watchalongs and horror based games. Kelly is married to fellow professional wrestler Alexander James.

Championships and accomplishments 
 Pro Wrestling Illustrated
 Ranked No. 89 of the top 100 female wrestlers in the PWI Female 100 in 2020
Ranked No. 453 of the top 500 singles wrestlers in the PWI 500 in 2021
 Westside Xtreme Wrestling
 wXw Women's Championship (1 time)
 wXw Women's Championship Tournament (2017)

References

External links 

  

1992 births
Portuguese female professional wrestlers
Sportspeople from Lisbon
Living people
21st-century professional wrestlers